is a song recorded by Japanese singer Maaya Sakamoto. It was released by FlyingDog as an exclusively digital single on October 30, 2013. The song was written by Natsumi and composed and arranged by Solaya. It is the theme song to the Monster Hunter: Frontier G, on which it is performed in-game by the character of Diva.

Composition
The song is sung in an original constructed language featured in the game Monster Hunter: Frontier G. A Japanese-language version of the song, re-named  and featuring lyrics reinterpreted by Sakamoto herself, was recorded in 2014 and included as a B-side to the double A-side single "Saved." / "Be Mine!".

Credits and personnel
Personnel

 Vocals, backing vocals – Maaya Sakamoto
 Songwriting – Natsumi, Solaya
 Arrangement, programming – Solaya
 Morin khuur – Bo Li
 Percussion – Matarō Misawa
 Piccolo, flute – Hideyo Takakuwa
 Clarinet – Kimio Yamane
 Harp – Tomoyuki Asakawa
 Strings – Gen Ittetsu Strings
 mixing – Miyoshi Toshihiko
 Engineering – Akitomo Takakuwa, Hiroaki Yamazaki
 Mastering – Hiroshi Kawasaki

References

2013 songs
2013 singles
Video game theme songs
Maaya Sakamoto songs
FlyingDog singles